Pops, We Love You is a 1979 album by various artists at Motown Records, including Marvin Gaye, Diana Ross, Stevie Wonder, Smokey Robinson, Jermaine Jackson, the Commodores, and Táta Vega. It was released on April 26, 1979.

Track listing

References

1979 albums